Lucia Vuolo (born 15 February 1963) is an Italian politician and a Member of the European Parliament since 2019.

References

1963 births
Living people
MEPs for Italy 2019–2024
21st-century women MEPs for Italy
Lega Nord MEPs